Daníelsson or Danielsson is a surname. Notable people with the surname include:

Alx Danielsson (born 1981), Swedish racing driver, 2006 champion of the Formula Renault 3.5 Series
Anders Danielsson (born 1953), the current director-general for the Swedish Security Service
Axel Danielsson (1863–1899), Swedish socialist agitator, journalist and writer, born in Värmland
Bengt Danielsson (1921–1997), anthropologist and a crew member on the Kon-Tiki raft expedition from South America to French Polynesia in 1947
Björn Danielsson (born 1977), retired Swedish professional ice hockey player currently assistant coach
Christian Danielsson (born 1966), photographer from Sweden
Einar Daníelsson (born 1970), retired footballer
Elma Danielsson (1865–1936), politician and journalist
Erik Danielsson of Watain, a Swedish black metal band from Uppsala, formed in 1998
Gösta Danielsson (1912–1978), Swedish chess master
Helgi Daníelsson (footballer, born 1933), football player from Iceland
Helgi Daníelsson (footballer, born 1981), football player from Iceland
Inge Danielsson (1941–2021), Swedish footballer
Jon Danielsson (born 1963), Icelandic economist teaching in the UK
Kikki Danielsson (born 1952), Swedish country, dansband and pop singer
Lars Danielsson (born 1958), Swedish jazz bassist, composer and record producer
Mats Danielsson, Swedish soldier who led the Swedish ISAF troops in Afghanistan during the war in Afghanistan
Mia Danielsson (born 1980), Swedish politician
Nicklas Danielsson (born 1984), Swedish ice hockey player
Palle Danielsson (born 1946), Swedish jazz double bassist born in Stockholm, Sweden
Peter Danielsson (born 1974), Swedish politician of the Moderate Party, member of the Riksdag 2002–2006, mayor of Helsingborg
Staffan Danielsson (born 1947), Swedish Centre Party politician, and a member of the Riksdag since 2004
Sven-Erik Danielsson (born 1960), Swedish cross country skier who competed from 1982 to 1998
Tage Danielsson (1928–1985), Swedish author, actor, poet and film director
Daniel Drouin (born 1984), Canadian Volkswagen tuner, aeronautics machinist, rides the wall to finish 1st place in Gran Turismo 2 High Speed Ring

See also
Denílson (disambiguation)
Donelson (disambiguation)
Danielsan (disambiguation)

Swedish-language surnames
Patronymic surnames
Surnames from given names